Helitours is a domestic airline in Sri Lanka operated by the Sri Lanka Air Force with aircraft not required for military use. It is currently the second-largest airline in Sri Lanka with a fleet of 16 aircraft behind Sri Lankan Airlines' 23.  The airline dominates the RML-TRR-JAF route on a thrice-weekly basis on their Chinese-built Xian MA60 aircraft.  The company slogan is Discover Serendipity.

History 
Helitours' air service was started in 1972 on the initiative of Air Chief Marshal Deshamanya Paddy Mendis to cater to the tourist industry.
 
By the end of 1972 Helitours was flying to Malé as well.
 
In 1973 a Convair 440 was purchased second hand from Eastern Airlines, to boost Helitours' operations between Ceylon and the Maldives.
 
In the early 1980s operations first slowed, then stopped due to operational requirements emerging from the onset of the Sri Lankan civil war.

However, in 2009 upon cessation of hostilities, the air force restarted Helitours' operations. During the civil war, the air force provided civil air transport to Jaffna, but this was not considered to be a Helitours operation.

Destinations 

Helitours is set to resume its flights to Velana International Airport in Malé in the near future using Xian MA-60 aircraft

Fleet

Fleet history

Notes

References

External links
Helitours

Airlines of Sri Lanka
Airlines established in 1972
Military airlines
Sri Lanka Air Force
Sri Lankan companies established in 1972